The Schoettler I was one of the first aircraft constructed in China, albeit with a German designer. It was a two-seat, single engine biplane, first flown in mid-summer 1923.

Design and development

In late 1923 Flight reported on what was claimed to be the first successful aircraft constructed in China. It was designed by the German engineer Leopold Carl Ferdinand Friedrich Schoettler (born April 7, 1881, in Bruchhausen-Vilsen, Germany; died September 27, 1948) but the only major components imported from Europe were the engine, instruments, wheels and dope for the fabric covering; everything else was locally produced from local materials by workers without aviation experience or modern machinery. Work on it began in the summer of 1922.

The Schoettler I was a conventional European style two seat tractor biplane, rather similar to the German Aviatik B.II and Albatros B.II designs, with equal span two bay wings. These were mounted with 2° of dihedral and 597 mm, almost 2 ft, of stagger. The Schoettler's empennage was also conventional.

The fuselage was likewise a standard rectangular section wooden girder structure, fabric covered except around the engine and a wood upper decking around the open, tandem cockpits for pilot and for the observer, who sat under the wing trailing edge. It tapered to a knife-edge at the tail. At the front the  Mercedes water-cooled upright inline engine was enclosed in a rectangular cross-section metal cowling which tapered vertically, exposing the upper cylinders, to a two blade propeller. At the rear of the housing an external radiator, with shutters for engine temperature control, projected on each side. The Schoettler had a conventional fixed undercarriage, with the mainwheels on a rigid axle mounted on V-struts.

Flight does not report a first flight date, but this was on or before 23 July 1923 when the Schoettler  was test flown by an ex-RAF pilot, W.E. Holland.  The latter reported good handling and an excellent, 360°, field of view for the observer noting the aircraft's potential for development. More recent articles claim the first flight by a Chinese built aircraft was that of the indigenously-designed Xianyi Rosamonde (or Dashatou Rosamonde) on 12 July 1923, though without mention of the Schoettler; the two aircraft were evidently close contemporaries.

Specifications

See also
 Feng Ru, Chinese-American who constructed and demonstrated an aircraft of his own design in China from 1911 to 1912

References

Biplanes
Single-engined tractor aircraft
1920s Chinese aircraft
Aircraft first flown in 1923